Miri Gold is the first non-Orthodox rabbi in Israel to have her salary paid by the government. She was born in Detroit, but in 1977 she immigrated to Kibbutz Gezer along with other North Americans. When the founder of the kibbutz's congregation (Kehilat Birkat Shalom) left, Gold began leading High Holidays services and preparing children for bat mitzvahs and bar mitzvahs. Gold entered the Reform movement's Hebrew Union College - Jewish Institute of Religion in 1994, and was ordained in 1999. At the time she was paid by the congregation, since the Israeli government did not recognize non-Orthodox rabbis. Gold petitioned the Israeli Supreme Court in 2005 to change this, and in 2012 a ruling by the Israeli attorney general granted her request.

References

Israeli Reform rabbis
Reform women rabbis
Year of birth missing (living people)
Living people
People from Detroit
Hebrew Union College – Jewish Institute of Religion alumni